Throughout his career, Frank Lloyd Wright was interested in mass production of housing. In 1954, he discovered that Marshall Erdman, who contracted the First Unitarian Society of Madison, was selling modest prefabricated homes. Wright offered to design better prefabs, ones that he believed could be marketed for $15,000, which was half as much as Marshall Erdman and Associates, Inc. (ME&A) were charging for their own version. Wright didn't do much on the project until late 1955, but by spring of 1956 he had final plans for three Usonian-type homes to be 
built exclusively by ME&A. The December 1956 issue of House & Home Magazine featured the Wright designed Marshall Erdman Prefab Houses and included Marshall in the cover story. No examples of Prefab #3 were ever built.

The prefab package Erdman offered included all the major structural components, interior and exterior walls, floors, windows and doors, as well as cabinets and woodwork. In addition to a lot, the buyer had to provide the foundation, the plumbing fixtures, heating units, electric wiring, and drywall, plus the paint.

Buyers had to submit a topographic map and photos of the lot to Wright before purchasing the property. Wright would determine where the home should sit on the lot. Wright also intended to inspect each home after completion, and to apply his famous glazed red signature brick to the home if it had been completed as planned.

Prefab #1

Wright's design was for a single story, L-shaped home with a pitched-roof bedroom wing joining a 
flat-roofed living-dining-kitchen area centered on a large masonry fireplace. A carport with one end of its roof resting on a detached storage shed completed the design. Eventually, Wright produced variations, including a fourth bedroom and options for a full or partial basement.

To limit costs, Wright used standard Andersen windows and Pella doors, and designed the prefab to be built using standard sheets of plywood, Masonite and drywall. The exterior was to be painted Masonite with horizontal redwood battens attached, though the house could also be built of stone or concrete block, or partially faced with stone.

Prefab #1 Houses:
 Eugene Van Tamelen House — Madison, Wisconsin (1956)
 Arnold Jackson House "Skyview" — moved from Madison (built 1957) to Beaver Dam, Wisconsin (in 1985). 
 Donald C. Duncan House — moved from Lisle, Illinois (built 1957) to Polymath Park, Westmoreland County, southwestern Pennsylvania (in 2002).
 Frank Iber House — Plover, Wisconsin (1957)
 Al Borah / Carl Post House — Barrington Hills, Illinois (1957)
 Catherine and William Cass House The Crimson Beech — Staten Island, New York (1959)
 Socrates Zaferiou House — Blauvelt, New York  (built 1961)
 Joseph Mollica House — Bayside, Wisconsin (1958)
 Dr. Edward & Laura Jane LaFond House — St. Joseph, Minnesota (1960)

Prefab #2

Prefab #2 is a square, 2 story home with a flat roof. The house has a large, square 2-story living room which is lit by a wall of windows. Also on the first floor are the dining area, kitchen, entry hall, utility room, and the master bedroom. A large concrete block fireplace separates the kitchen and living room. A stairway leads to a balcony and three second-story bedrooms.

The house is constructed from concrete block with horizontal board and batten siding. A row of windows just below the soffit make the chunky flat roof appear to float above the house. A carport attached to one corner of the house completes the design.

Prefab #2 Houses:
 Walter Rudin House – Madison, Wisconsin (1957)
 James McBean Residence – Rochester, Minnesota (1957)

Both houses have the same floor plan and vary only in minor details such as paint color and siting.

See also 
American System-Built Homes

References 

 Storrer, William Allin. The Frank Lloyd Wright Companion. University Of Chicago Press, 2006,  (S.406, S.407, S.408, S.409, S.410, S.411, S.412)

External links 
 Frank Iber House on Arcaid
 Photo of the Al Borah / Carl Post House
 Photo of the Socrates Zaferiou House

Frank Lloyd Wright buildings
Prefabricated houses